Timothy Byram-Wigfield is an English organist and conductor.

Timothy Byram-Wigfield was a chorister at King's College, Cambridge under David Willcocks and Philip Ledger. Following study at the Royal College of Music as organist, pianist and violist, he became organ scholar at Christ Church, Oxford, sub-organist at Winchester Cathedral, becoming Master of the Music at St Mary's Cathedral, Edinburgh (Episcopal) in 1991. In 1999 he took up the new post of Director of Music at Jesus College, Cambridge and in 2004 was appointed Director of Music at St George's Chapel, Windsor Castle.

From 1993–1998 he trained the Scottish Chamber Orchestra Chorus and from 1999 he was Conductor of the Northampton Bach Choir. In 2008 he was appointed Associate Conductor of the Oxford Bach Choir.

He also teaches the organ and the piano at Eton College.

In 2013, he was appointed Director of Music at All Saints, Margaret Street, in succession to Paul Brough. He departed from this post in November 2018.

Recordings

Organ
 2009 – Messiaen: Complete Organ Works Vol 4
 2007 - The Kelvingrove Organ
 2007 – Hollins Organ Works
 2006 – Messiaen: Les Corps Glorieux
 2006 – A Windsor Collection
 2002 – A Land of Pure Delight (RSCM Millennium Youth Choir)
 2000 – Twelve Organs of Edinburgh
 1995 – The Organ of St Mary's Cathedral, Edinburgh
 1994 - Weelkes: Cathedral Music Anthems Vol 10 (Winchester Cathedral Choir, David Hill)
 1993 – Tallis: Sacred Choral Works (Winchester Cathedral Choir, Winchester Quiristers, David Hill)
 1991 – Jerusalem  (Winchester Cathedral Choir, David Hill)

Conducting
 2009 – The Lamentations of Jeremiah (Lay Clerks of St George's Chapel Windsor)
 2006 - O How Glorious is the Kingdom (Choir of St George's Chapel Windsor, Roger Judd)
 2005 – Abide with Me and Other Favourite Hymns (Marlowe Brass Ensemble, Choir of St George's Chapel Windsor)

References

External links
Family biography

English classical organists
British male organists
Cathedral organists
English composers
Alumni of Christ Church, Oxford
Living people
Year of birth missing (living people)
Place of birth missing (living people)
21st-century organists
21st-century British male musicians
Choristers of the Choir of King's College, Cambridge
St Mary's Cathedral, Edinburgh (Episcopal)
Male classical organists